Wild Elephinks is a Popeye theatrical cartoon short, starring William "Billy" Costello as Popeye, Bonnie Poe as Olive Oyl, William Pennell as a Lion and Charles Lawrence as Wimpy. It was released in 1933 and was the fifth entry in the Popeye the Sailor series of theatrical cartoons released by Paramount Pictures, lasting through 1957.

Plot
Popeye and Olive Oyl land in the jungle and must fight off various animals including a wild elephant and a gorilla.

Home video
This cartoon is available on DVD in the four-disc set Popeye the Sailor: 1933-1938, Volume 1.

References

External links 

Popeye the Sailor theatrical cartoons
1933 films
1933 animated films
Paramount Pictures short films
American black-and-white films
Fleischer Studios short films
Short films directed by Dave Fleischer
1930s American films